The Loyal is Tiger Lou's second album, featuring dark, melancholic and electric sounds.

Track listing

There were two "The Loyal" albums released. One was to Startracks on Oct 10, 2005. The other was to Eyeball Records on Oct 26, 2005. The difference between the albums is their 11th track. The one to Startracks is "All I Have" - 3:55, and the one to Eyeball Records is "Pilots" - 5:18

"Woland's First" – 0:14
"The Loyal" – 5:35
"Patterns" – 3:03
"Functions" – 3:14
"Until I'm There" – 4:11
"Nixon" – 3:09
"National Ave" – 2:47
"Ten Minutes To Take Off" – 4:13
"Albino Apparel" – 3:05
"Like My Very Own Blood" – 4:05
"All I Have" – 3:55
"Days Will Pass" - 3:43
"Woland's Last" - 5:38

2005 albums
Tiger Lou albums